Wally Gator is an American animated television series produced by Hanna-Barbera Productions that originally aired as one of the segments from the 1962–1963 block The Hanna-Barbera New Cartoon Series. The other two segments that compose the series are Lippy the Lion and Hardy Har Har and Touché Turtle and Dum Dum. The segment consisted of 52 episodes over one year. He appears in the HBO Max series Jellystone!  where he is portrayed as the town ditz and played by Jeff Bergman.

Plot 
Wally Gator (voiced by Daws Butler impersonating Ed Wynn) is an anthropomorphic, happy-go-lucky alligator who wears a collar and a pork pie hat. Although his catchy theme song describes him as a "swingin' alligator of the swamp," his home is in the city zoo. Mr. Twiddle (voiced by Don Messick) is the zookeeper who keeps a close watch on Wally, who likes to check out what life is like in the outside world.

Analysis 
Animation historian Christopher P. Lehman noted that Wally Gator follows the formula that Hanna-Barbera established in the previous series, such as the Yogi Bear series. The set up in which of these shows placed an animal character within a human-controlled environment and had these characters deal with the social boundaries placed and enforced by humans. An example being: Yogi lives in a park under the care of a park ranger; Wally lives in a zoo under the supervision of a zookeeper. The theme that drives the series is Wally's desire to escape the zoo, a derivative of the Top Cat series, where the titular character keeps trying to get away from life in the alley.

Lehman notes a rather depressing underlying theme: the zoo and life in captivity seem to be the proper place for Wally. No matter how much he struggles to fit in the society of the outside world, Wally remains an "Other" and is doomed to fail. The status quo is following every unsuccessful attempt at change.

Episodes

Cast 
 Daws Butler as Wally Gator
 Don Messick as Mr. Twiddle
 Mel Blanc as additional voices, such as Colonel Zachary Gator (ep. "Carpet Bragger")

Home media 
Episodes of Wally Gator were released on VHS many times. A DVD set release of the complete series was originally announced for 2006 from Warner Bros. for the Hanna-Barbera Classics Collection but was later canceled due to the poor condition of the masters and was delayed. In 2006, a Warner spokesperson said of the DVDs: "They were pulled because significant remastering work needed to be researched. We are exploring adding them back to the schedule next year." The first episode is available on the DVD set Saturday Morning Cartoons 1960's Vol. 2. The show was released on iTunes video in 2017 as part of Hanna-Barbera's 60th anniversary and was released on a made to order DVD set from Warner Archive on June 25, 2019.

See also
 List of works produced by Hanna-Barbera Productions
 List of Hanna-Barbera characters
 The Hanna-Barbera New Cartoon Series
 Lippy the Lion and Hardy Har Har
 Touché Turtle and Dum Dum

References

Sources

External links 
 Big Cartoon DataBase: Wally Gator
 Toonopedia
 

1960s American animated television series
1962 American television series debuts
1963 American television series endings
American children's animated comedy television series
English-language television shows
Fictional Cajuns
Fictional crocodilians
Animated television series about reptiles and amphibians
Yogi Bear characters
Hanna-Barbera characters
Television series by Hanna-Barbera
Television series by Screen Gems
First-run syndicated television programs in the United States
Male characters in animation
Fiction about zoos